Cavalier Rock is an isolated rock lying  southwest of Cape Adriasola, off the south part of Adelaide Island. It was named by the UK Antarctic Place-Names Committee in 1963 for Sub. Lieutenant Geoffrey A. Cavalier, Royal Navy, helicopter pilot of HMS Protector who flew the reconnaissances which located this feature.

References 

Rock formations of Adelaide Island